The Western Union Short Film Competition is a short film competition, hosted by the Indian Film Festival of Melbourne, that is open to filmmakers from Australia and India. It provides filmmakers with an opportunity to showcase their films to a wide audience and establish connections within the industry.

Previous winners

2016 - 'Female Empowerment'

Out on a Lim - Joshua Walker (Aus)

2015 - 'Equality'

Rape: It’s Your Fault - All India Bakchod (India)

Road to Grand Final - Mark Hellinger and Jesse Maskell (Aus)

2014 - 'Hope'

Chasni - Abhishek Verma (India)

Makeover – Don Percy (Aus)

2013 - 'Freedom'

Give Sheep a Chance - Sean McCart (Aus)

Sati - Nilesh Desai (India)

Lockie n Love - Dimi Nakov (NZ)

The Interview - Faiz Sharif (Victorian Special Mention)

2012

Letters Home - Neilesh Verma

2011 - 'Dreams'

Mumbaikar Ganesh - Collin D’Cunha (India)

Khatabah - Ridwan Hassim (Aus)

Blank Spaces - Rajneel Singh (NZ)

References

Australian film awards